Escuela Militar is an underground metro station on the Line 1 of the Santiago Metro, in Santiago, Chile. It is located beneath the cloverleaf-like interchange of Apoquindo Avenue and Américo Vespucio Avenue. The station was opened on 22 August 1980 as part of the extension of the line from Salvador to Escuela Militar. It remained the eastern terminus of the Line 1 until 7 January 2010, when the line was extended to Los Dominicos, and is named for the nearby Escuela Militar del Libertador Bernardo O'Higgins.

Bomb blast in September 2014 
On September 8, 2014, a blast injured 14 people. The bomb exploded at 14:00 pm in a trashcan.

References

Santiago Metro stations
Railway stations opened in 1980
1980 establishments in Chile
Santiago Metro Line 1